The Billion Dollar Spy: A True Story of Cold War Espionage and Betrayal is a non-fiction history book by David E. Hoffman.

Synopsis
The book covers the life of Russian engineer Adolf Tolkachev, nicknamed the "Billion Dollar Spy", who was executed by the Soviet Union after being caught passing information on classified radar technology to CIA agents.

Reviews
The book received mostly positive reviews. Lawrence D. Freedman, writing for Foreign Affairs, described it as a "must-read" and praised it for "[describing] in such detail what it meant to run American agents in Cold War–era Moscow". Bob Drogan of the LA Times said that "To his credit, Hoffman describes the drab reality of most espionage work: long waits, endless paperwork, bumbling bureaucracy and often shoddy equipment." Kirkus Reviews described it as "an intricate, mesmerizing portrayal of the KGB-CIA spy culture".

Adaptation
A thriller movie based on the book was announced in 2021 starring Mads Mikkelsen and Armie Hammer.

References

2015 non-fiction books
American non-fiction books
Non-fiction books about the Central Intelligence Agency
Doubleday (publisher) books